Feininger is a German surname. Notable people with the surname include:

Karl Feininger (1844-1922), German-American musician, father of Lyonel
Lyonel Feininger (1871–1956), German-American painter, caricaturist, and comic strip artist
Andreas Feininger (1906-1999), French-born, American photographer, son of Lyonel, educated at the Bauhaus as an architect
T. Lux Feininger (1910-2011), German-born, American painter, son of Lyonel, educated at the Bauhaus, who worked as a photographer until 1929

See also
6653 Feininger, main-belt asteroid

German-language surnames